William Shatner (born 1931) is a Canadian actor who has had a career in film and television for seven decades. Shatner's breakthrough role was his portrayal of James T. Kirk in Star Trek.

Film

Television

Video games

Commercials

See also
William Shatner's musical career
List of awards and nominations received by William Shatner

References

External links

 
William Shatner's Official Website

Works by William Shatner
Male actor filmographies
Director filmographies
Canadian filmographies